The CSMT - Madgaon Junction Jan Shatabdi Express is a Superfast Express train belonging to Indian Railways - Konkan Railway division that runs between Chhatrapati Shivaji Maharaj Terminus and Madgaon in India.

During monsoon timetable , 12052 will not go in reverse direction due to time clash. So it will rest at Madgaon Junction coming from CSMT and next day that same rake will originate from Madgaon Junction. It is one of the fastest and longest route running Jan Shatabdi train in Konkan Railways and is immensely popular amongst the people travelling to Konkan and Goa. Earlier this train used to originate/terminate at Dadar Terminus in Mumbai.

Coaches
This train has presently has 1 Vistadome Coach, 3 AC Chair Car , 10 Second Class Jan Shatabdi seating coaches , 1 SLR Coach & 1 Generator Car.

Service

It covers the distance of 572 kilometers in 8 hours 40  mins (65.26 km/hr) as train number 12051 & in 9 hours (66.52 km/hr) as train number 12052.

Route

Traction 
Both trains were hauled by an Ernakulam based WDM-3A twins or WDP-4, GOC WDP-4B or 4D. Currently as Konkan Railways have completed electrification, the train is now hauled by a WCAM3 from Kalyan shed.

Gallery

References 

 http://www.cr.indianrailways.gov.in/view_detail.jsp?lang=0&dcd=2164&id=0,4,268
 https://economictimes.indiatimes.com/industry/transportation/railways/see-through-vistadome-coach-makes-mumbai-goa-journey-more-spectacular/360-degree-rotatable-seats/slideshow/60751234.cms

External links

Sister Trains
 Lokmanya Tilak Terminus - Karmali AC Superfast Express
 Konkan Kanya Express
 Mandovi Express
 Mumbai CST - Karmali Tejas Express
 Mumbai LTT - Madgaon AC Double Decker Express

Rail transport in Maharashtra
Rail transport in Goa
Jan Shatabdi Express trains
Konkan Railway
Transport in Mumbai
Transport in Goa
Transport in Margao